Maharaja Agrasen Institute of Management and Technology (MAIMT) was founded in 1997, under Kurukshetra University with the approval of AICTE. It is located in Jagadhri, near Chandigarh. It is being run by Maharaja Agrasen Sabha which runs another college named Maharaja Agrasen College.

Admissions

MCA

Admissions for MCA are made on the basis of the inter se merit of Online Entrance Test-OLET (MCA)-2014 through online Off- Campus counseling conducted by HSCS through NIC. Admission for MCA for Kashmiri Migrants (KM) category shall be made on the basis of inter-se merit of percentage of qualifying exam through On-line Off-Campus counseling.
To be eligible for pursuing MCA from this institute one should be a pass in any recognized bachelor's degree of a minimum of 3 years' duration in any discipline with Mathematics at 10 + 2 level. OR Should be a pass in any recognized bachelor's degree of minimum 3 years' duration in any discipline with Mathematics / Statistics as one of the subjects. OR Should be a pass in BCA Degree of minimum three years duration from a recognized University.

MBA
The basis for admission to MBA course in Govt./ Govt. Aided/ University Department/Private colleges in the state of Haryana for the session 2014–15; will be the highest score obtained by a candidate in the valid MAT conducted by AIMA for session 2014–15. No separate State Entrance Test for Admission to MBA course will be conducted. The Management quota seats and the leftover seats will be filled strictly on the basis of the merit of the qualifying examination.
To be eligible for pursuing MBA from this institute one should be a Bachelor's or Post Graduate Degree in any discipline from a recognized university or an examination recognized as equivalent thereto by Kurukshetra University, Kurukshetra, Maharishi Dayanand University, Rohtak, Guru Jambheshwar University, Hisar, Hisar, and Ch. Devi Lal University, Sirsa,  as the case may be with not less than 50% marks in aggregate (minimum pass marks 45% in case of SC/ST candidates)

Infrastructure

Lecture Theatre

Computer Labs
The computer lab on the first floor of College Library provides computing and media services.

General computing is accessible for students, professors, and staff. Multimedia support , like video editing stations and scanners are also present.

It also has a classroom for software training, as well as consultancy services from the Media Studios and DesignLab.

Check-out equipment and a collection of computer manuals are also present.

Auditorium
MAIMT has a 250-seat auditorium.

Library

Sports & Cultural Programmes

Research and development
Students of MAIMT have conducted research projects for companies like Cipla Ltd., Escotel Mobile Communication Ltd., Chanderpur Works, Golden Laminates Ltd., and Pragati Silicons, ICICI Capital Services, and GM Sports Ltd.

Scholarship
Maharaja Agrasen Scholarship to excellent performers.
Rs.5,000 scholarship for students with >= 75% aggregate marks in Graduation.
Scholarship for Scheduled Caste (SC), BC, and Other Backward Class (OBC) students pursuing MBA or MCA, according to Govt. norms.

Other activities
MAIMT also runs the following Cells and Clubs:

Student Counseling Cell (SCC)
SCC brings together student & institute representatives, and claims to offer a platform to discuss all issues across the table.

Institute Industrial Interface Cell (IIIC)
IIIC helps for the Industrial Visits for students of MBA & MCA.  The cell also hosts guest speakers.

Career Counseling Cell (3C)

Entrepreneurship Development Cell 
Entrepreneurship Development Cell provides assistance to entrepreneurs and arranges EDPs (Entrepreneurship Development Programmes) & MDPs (Management Development Programmes).

HR Club

Finance Club
Finance Club is a student club focusing on finance. It also runs a virtual stock exchange.

M3Club
M3 (MAIMT Marketing Masters) is a club focused on marketing-related topics.

IT Club
IT Club runs ProgC programme, which is a student programme related to programming and software development.

YEC Club
Young Executive Club (YEC) is a platform for students to interact with executives from industry.

Sports Club
The club organizes Cricket, Table Tennis, Badminton, and Volleyball tournaments. It also runs Martial Arts classes for self-defense.

References

Universities and colleges in Haryana
All India Council for Technical Education
Educational institutions established in 1997
Education in Yamunanagar
Kurukshetra University
Memorials to Agrasen
1997 establishments in Haryana